Axapusco is a municipality, in Mexico State in Mexico. It's municipal seat is the town of Axapusco and largest town is Jaltepec.  The municipality covers an area of  260.01 km².

As of 2005, the municipality had a total population of 21,915

Politics

References

Municipalities of the State of Mexico
Populated places in the State of Mexico